William Joseph Houston (born 1968) is a United States Navy vice admiral who serves as commander of the Naval Submarine Forces, Submarine Force Atlantic and Allied Submarine Command since September 10, 2021. He most recently served as Director of the Undersea Warfare Division. Previously, he was the Director of Plans and Operations of the United States Naval Forces Europe-Africa, Deputy Commander of the United States Sixth Fleet, and the Commander of Submarine Group 8. 

Raised in Grand Island, New York, Houston earned a Bachelor of Science degree in electrical engineering from the University of Notre Dame in 1990. He later received an Master of Business Administration degree from the College of William & Mary.

References

|-

|-

1968 births
Living people
Place of birth missing (living people)
People from Grand Island, New York
University of Notre Dame alumni
College of William & Mary alumni
United States submarine commanders
United States Navy admirals